The Call of Africa (Spanish: La llamada de África) is a 1952 Spanish war film directed by César Fernández Ardavín and starring Irma Torres, Ángel Picazo and Gérard Tichy. It is set in 1940 in Spanish Morocco. German agents operating out of Vichy-controlled Mauritania attempt to sabotage a strategic Spanish airstrip. The Spanish and their native Moroccan allies are able to thwart this. The film's hero a Spanish colonial army officer, enters into a relationship with a Berber princess. It was made at a time when Spain's dicator General Franco was trying to forge a closer relationship with the Arab states of the Middle East and the film promotes a concept of the "blood brotherhood" that links the Spanish and Moroccans.

Cast
In alphabetical order
 Ali Beiba Uld Abidin 
 Yahadid Ben Ahmed Lehbib 
 Farachi Ben Emboiric
 Embarc Ben Mohamed Lamin 
 Mario Berriatúa 
 Tomás Blanco 
 Fernando Heiko Vassel 
 Tony Hernández 
 José Jaspe
 José Manuel Martín
 Mayrata O'Wisiedo 
 Ángel Picazo
 Gustavo Re 
 Santiago Rivero 
 Emilio Ruiz de Córdoba 
 Gérard Tichy 
 Irma Torres

References

Bibliography 
 Bentley, Bernard. A Companion to Spanish Cinema. Boydell & Brewer 2008.
 Passerini, Luisa, Labanyi, Jo & Diehl, Karen. Europe and Love in Cinema. Intellect Books, 2012.

External links 
 

1952 war films
1952 films
1950s Spanish-language films
Films directed by César Fernández Ardavín
Films set in Morocco
Films set in 1940
Films scored by Jesús García Leoz
Films shot in Almería
Spanish black-and-white films
Spanish World War II films
1950s Spanish films